Master Spy, (also known as Checkmate), is a 1963 British spy film directed by Montgomery Tully and starring Stephen Murray, June Thorburn and Alan Wheatley. The film was based on the short story "They Also Serve" by Gerald Anstruther and Paul White. 

The US release film poster identifies the Master Spy as Agent 909.

Plot
A Russian nuclear scientist, Dr Boris Turganev, defects from an unnamed country to the West. He is employed by the UK Government at a top secret scientific establishment to continue his work on neutron rays. He is introduced to a wealthy local man, Paul Skelton, and they identify themselves to each other as spies. Turganev’s colleagues start to suspect he is stealing secrets for the communists; Turganev passes information to Skelton under the cover of their private games of chess. British Intelligence arrests them, and they are tried and sentenced to long prison terms.

Turganev’s colleague is puzzled that the secret document which Turgenev was passing to Skelton had been altered and would not work. In a plot twist, it is revealed that Turganev was working for British Intelligence, who suspected Skelton and wanted to catch his spy ring. A prison escape is engineered for Turganev so that he can return to his own country and continue his activities for the British with his cover intact.

Cast
 Stephen Murray as Boris Turganev 
 June Thorburn as Leila 
 Alan Wheatley as Paul Skelton 
 John Carson as Richard Colman
 John Bown as John Baxter 
 Jack Watson as Captain Foster 
 Ernest Clark as Doctor Pembury
 Peter Gilmore as Tom Masters 
 Marne Maitland as Doctor Asafu 
 Ellen Pollock as Doctor Morrell 
 Hugh Morton as Sir Gilbert Saunders 
 Basil Dignam as Richard Horton 
 Victor Beaumont as Petrov
 Hamilton Dyce as Airport Controller
 Michael Peake as Barnes
 Dan Cressey as Policeman (uncredited)
 Derek Francis as Police Inspector (uncredited)
 John G. Heller as Police Officer (uncredited)
 Aileen Lewis as Woman boarding a plane (uncredited)
 John H. Watson as Detective at airport (uncredited)

Critical reception
The New York Times called the film, "a TEPID, square-cut espionage drama." 
AllMovie wrote, "While only 71 minutes, Master Spy has enough plot twists for a library-full of Fleming and LeCarre."

References

External links

1963 films
British spy films
Cold War spy films
Films directed by Montgomery Tully
British black-and-white films
Films based on short fiction
1960s spy films
Films scored by Ken Thorne
Films shot at MGM-British Studios
1960s English-language films
1960s British films